The state of Oregon in the United States has established an international reputation for its production of wine, ranking fourth in the country behind California, Washington, and New York. Oregon has several different growing regions within the state's borders that are well-suited to the cultivation of grapes; additional regions straddle the border between Oregon and the states of Washington and Idaho. Wine making dates back to pioneer times in the 1840s, with commercial production beginning in the 1960s.

American Viticultural Areas entirely within the state are the Willamette Valley AVA (with 10 nested AVAs) and the Southern Oregon AVA with (5 nested AVAs). Parts of the Columbia Gorge, Walla Walla Valley, and Snake River Valley AVAs lie within Oregon. Pinot noir and Pinot Gris are the top two grapes grown, with over  harvested in 2016. Oregon winemakers sold just under 3.4 million cases in 2016.

With 908 wineries in Oregon, a tourism industry has developed around wine tasting. Much of the tourism focuses on the wineries and tasting rooms in and around the Yamhill Valley southwest of Portland. It is estimated that enotourism contributed USD $207.5 million to the state economy in 2013 excluding sales at wineries and tasting rooms.

History

Wine has been produced in Oregon since the Oregon Territory was settled in the 1840s; however, winemaking has only been a significant industry in the state since the 1960s. Grapes were first planted in the Oregon Territory in 1847. Valley View, the first recorded winery, was established by Peter Britt in the late 1850s in Jacksonville. Throughout the 19th century, there was experimentation with various varietals by immigrants to the state. In 1904, an Oregon winemaker won a prize at the St. Louis World's Fair. Wine production stopped in the United States during Prohibition. As in other states, the Oregon wine industry lay dormant for thirty years after Prohibition was repealed.

The Oregon wine industry started to rebuild in the 1960s, when California winemakers opened several vineyards in the state. By 1970, there were five commercial wineries, with 35 recorded acres.

This included the planting of Pinot noir grapes in the Willamette Valley, a region long thought too cold to be suitable for viticulture. In the 1970s, more out-of-state winemakers migrated to the state and started to organize as an industry. The state's land-use laws had prevented rural hillsides from being turned into housing tracts, preserving a significant amount of land suitable for vineyards. In 1979, The Eyrie Vineyards entered a 1975 Pinot noir in the Wine Olympics; the wine was rated among the top Pinots in the world, thus gaining the region its first international recognition.

The accolades continued into the 1980s, and the Oregon wine industry continued to add both wineries and vineyards. The state industry continued to market itself, establishing the first of several AVAs (American Viticulture Areas) in the state. The state also grew strong ties with the Burgundy region of France, as Oregon's governor Neil Goldschmidt paid an official visit to Burgundy and a leading French winemaking family bought land in Dundee.

In the early 1990s, the wine industry was threatened by a Phylloxera infestation in the state, but winemakers quickly turned to the use of resistant rootstocks to prevent any serious damage. The state legislature enacted several new laws designed to promote winemaking and wine distribution. The state found a newfound focus on "green" winemaking, leading the global wine industry into more environmentally friendly practices. In 2005, there were 314 wineries and 519 vineyards in operation in Oregon. By 2014, the a number of wineries in the state has increased to 676, the 3rd most behind California and Washington. Oregon remains the 4th largest wine producer in the country in cases produced behind New York.

Varieties of wine
Like other wines produced in the United States, Oregon wines are marketed as varietals. Oregon law requires that wines produced in the state must be identified by the grape variety from which it was made, and for most varietals, it must contain at least 90% of that variety. The exceptions to the 90% law are the following varietals: Red and White Bordeaux varietals, Red and White Rhône varietals, Sangiovese, Tempranillo, Zinfandel and Tannat. For these wines, they follow the Federal guidelines of 75%. Oregon law has long forbidden the use of place names, except as appellations of origin. Oregon is most famous for its Pinot noir, which is produced throughout the state. Pinot noirs from the Willamette Valley have received much critical acclaim from wine connoisseurs and critics, and Oregon is regarded as one of the premier Pinot-producing regions in the world.

In 2016 the top five varieties produced in Oregon were:
 Pinot noir , 
 Pinot gris , 
 Chardonnay , 
 Riesling , 
 Cabernet Sauvignon , 

Other varieties with significant production by harvested acres in 2016 are Syrah, Merlot, Tempranillo, Pinot blanc, Gewürztraminer, Viognier, Cabernet franc, Müller-Thurgau, Sauvignon blanc, and Zinfandel, V. vinifera based wines produced in smaller quantities include Arneis, Baco noir, Black Muscat, Chenin blanc, Dolcetto, Gamay noir, Grenache, Marechal Foch, Malbec, Muscat, Nebbiolo, Petite Syrah, Sangiovese, and Sémillon. The state also produces fruit wine, sparkling wine, late harvest wine, ice wine, and dessert wine.

Facts and figures

Out of all US wine growing regions, Oregon ranks third in number of wineries and fourth in production. Nearly 3 million cases of Oregon wine were sold in 2015. The retail value of these cases was $470,650,919 a 9% increase over the previous vintage.

The industry has had a significant economic impact on the state. The industry contributed a total of US$3.35 billion to the Oregon economy. 17,100 people participate in the wine industry with $527 million in wages. In 2014 70% was sold to US markets outside Oregon and 4% was sold internationally.

Oregon produces wine on a much smaller scale than the California wine industry. Oregon's leading producer, King Estate, ships only 401,400 cases per year and most produce under 35,000 cases. The state features many small wineries that produce less than 5,000 cases per year. In contrast, E & J Gallo, the United States' largest winery with more than 50 different brands including Washington's Columbia Winery and Covey Run holds a 22.8% share of the US market. The majority of wineries in the state operate their own vineyards, although some purchase grapes on the market. Oregon contains a significant number of independent vineyards.

The Oregon wine industry focuses on the higher-priced segments of the wine market. Oregon growers receive a higher average return per ton and a higher average revenue per case than do growers in other wine-producing regions in the United States. Despite producing a much smaller volume of wine, Oregon winery revenues per capita are comparable to those of New York and Washington.

Major wine-producing regions
There are, loosely speaking, three main wine producing regions with a major presence in the state of Oregon, as defined by non-overlapping American Viticultural Areas. Two of them—the Willamette Valley AVA and the Southern Oregon AVA—are wholly contained within Oregon; a third, the Columbia Gorge AVA straddles the Columbia River and includes territory in both Oregon and Washington; however, this AVA is considered to be an Oregon AVA. Portions of the Walla Walla Valley AVA, an area primarily in Washington (along with the Columbia Valley AVA, which contains it), descend into Oregon in the Milton-Freewater area. The Southern Oregon AVA was recently created as the union of two Southern Oregon winegrowing regions long considered distinct, the Rogue Valley and the Umpqua Valley. Several other smaller AVAs are found within some of these larger regions. The Snake River Valley AVA, which straddles Oregon's border with Idaho along the Snake River, is the first AVA to include a part of Eastern Oregon.

Willamette Valley AVA

The Willamette Valley AVA is the wine growing region that encompasses the Willamette Valley. It stretches from the Columbia River in the north to just south of Eugene in the south, where the Willamette Valley ends; and from the Oregon Coast Range in the West to the Cascade Mountains in the East. At , it is the largest AVA in the state, and contains most of the state's wineries; with 545 as of 2016.

The climate of Willamette Valley is mild year-round, with cool, wet winters and warm, dry summers; extreme temperatures are uncommon. Most rainfall occurs outside the growing season and the valley gets relatively little snow. Not all parts of the Valley are suitable for viticulture, and most wineries and vineyards are found west of the Willamette River, with the largest concentration in Yamhill County.

The region is best known for its Pinot noir, and also produces large amounts of Pinot gris, Chardonnay, Pinot blanc, and Riesling. The region also produces Cabernet Sauvignon, Gewürztraminer, Müller-Thurgau, Sémillon, and Zinfandel grapes, but in far smaller quantities.

The region is divided into 10 nested AVAs: Chehalem Mountains AVA, Dundee Hills AVA, Eola-Amity Hills AVA, Laurelwood District AVA, Lower Long Tom AVA, McMinnville AVA, Ribbon Ridge AVA, Tualatin Hills AVA, Van Duzer Corridor AVA, and the Yamhill-Carlton District AVA. Ribbon Ridge AVA and Laurelwood District AVA are nested within the Chehalem Mountains AVA. In addition, many wine connoisseurs further divide the Willamette Valley into northern and southern regions approximately at the latitude of Salem.

Southern Oregon AVA

The Southern Oregon AVA is an AVA formed as the union of two existing AVAs—the Rogue Valley AVA and the Umpqua Valley AVA. (A small strip of the connecting territory is included in the Southern Oregon AVA to make it a contiguous region; however, this strip passes through mountains regions not suitable for vineyards.) This AVA was established in 2004 to allow the two principal regions in Southern Oregon to jointly market themselves.
As the Rogue Valley and Umpqua Valley regions produce different grapes and different varietals, they are examined separately.

Umpqua Valley AVA
The Umpqua Valley AVA contains the drainage basin of the Umpqua River, excluding mountainous regions. The Umpqua Valley has a warmer climate than the Willamette Valley, but is cooler than the Rogue Valley to the south. It is the oldest post-prohibition wine region in Oregon. Grapes grown here include Tempranillo, Baco noir, Pinot noir, Pinot gris, Cabernet Sauvignon, Chardonnay, and Riesling, Grüner Veltliner, and a host of lesser-known Vitis vinifera. The region includes two sub-AVAs, the Red Hill Douglas County, Oregon AVA, a single vineyard AVA, as well as the Elkton Oregon AVA, which was established in early 2013.

Rogue Valley AVA
The Rogue Valley AVA includes the drainage basin of the Rogue River and several tributaries, including the Illinois River, the Applegate River, and Bear Creek. Most wineries in the region are found along with one of these three tributaries, rather than along the Rogue River itself. The three valleys differ greatly in terroir, with the easternmost Bear Creek valley being warmest and driest, and the westernmost Illinois River valley being coolest and wettest. Each river valley has a unique climate and grows different varieties of grapes. Overall, however, this region is the warmest and driest of Oregon's wine-growing regions. The region has one sub-AVA, the Applegate Valley AVA.

Columbia Gorge AVA
The Columbia Gorge AVA is found in the Columbia Gorge. This region straddles the Columbia River, and thus lies in both Oregon and Washington; it is made up of Hood River and Wasco counties in Oregon, and Skamania and Klickitat counties in Washington.

 

The region lies to the east of the summits of nearby Mount Hood and Mount Adams, situated in their rain shadows; thus, the region is significantly drier than the Willamette Valley. It also exhibits significant differences in elevation due to gorge geography, and strong winds common in the area also play a factor in the region's climate. This allows a wide variety of grapes to be grown in the Columbia Gorge. The region has nearly 40 vineyards, growing a wide variety of grapes, including Syrah, Pinot noir, Chardonnay, Gewürztraminer, Zinfandel, Cabernet Sauvignon, Pinot gris, Riesling, and Sangiovese.

Columbia Valley AVA

Portions of northeastern Oregon (in the vicinity of Milton-Freewater) are part of the Walla Walla Valley AVA established in 1984; which in turn is nested within the Columbia Valley AVA. Both Columbia Valley and Walla Walla Valley AVAs reside primarily within Washington state. The Oregon subsection has 5 wineries and  planted. Wines grown in the valley include Syrah, Merlot, and Cabernet Sauvignon, as well as Sangiovese and a few exotic varietals including Counoise, Carmenère, Mourvèdre, Cabernet Franc, Nebbiolo and Barbera.

A new nested AVA, The Rocks District of Milton–Freewater, was established in 2015.

Snake River Valley AVA

A new viticultural area along the Snake River was established on April 9, 2007. Principally located in Idaho, the area also encompasses two large counties in Eastern Oregon, Baker County and Malheur County. The region's climate is unique among AVAs in Oregon; the average temperature is relatively cool and rainfall is low, creating a shorter growing season. Current production is led by hardy grapes such as Riesling, Gewürztraminer, and Chardonnay. The climate also lends itself extremely well to the production of ice wine. However, the AVA is quite large and warmer microclimates within the area can also support different types of grapes such as Cabernet Sauvignon and Merlot.

Enotourism

With the continuing improvement in the region's winemaking reputation, enotourism in Oregon has become a significant industry in its own right. On-site sales are becoming an increasingly important part of the business of Oregon winemaking, and other businesses that cater to wine tourists, such as lodging, fine restaurants, art galleries, have been appearing in places like Dundee, many of which have long been rural farming communities. Wine festivals and tastings are commonplace. It is estimated that enotourism contributed USD $207.5 million to the state economy in 2013 excluding sales at wineries and tasting rooms. There are approximately 1.8 million visits to Oregon wineries each year, 59% by Oregonians and 41% from out-of-state visitors. Major events drawing significant numbers of tourists to wine country include the International Pinot Noir Celebration which is held the last weekend of July every year since 1987 and the more recent Oregon Chardonnay Celebration.

Since wine themed events are a significant driver of tourism new ones are launched each year.  
 Memorial Day weekend and Thanksgiving weekend (since 1983) feature open house events at most wineries across the entire state.
¡Salud! is a wine fundraising organization that has held annual November auctions since 1991 
The Oregon Wine Experience is in its 19th year.
 The Pour Oregon wine festival, launched in 2017 by Oregon wine club Cellar 503, typically features 50+ wineries from the entire state.

Facilities for wine tourists in Oregon are considered underdeveloped compared to wine regions in California, especially premium growing regions like the Napa Valley AVA. Only 5% of overnight leisure trips in the state involve visits to wineries, a much smaller figure than comparable Californian growing regions, which range from 10% to 25%.

The increase in winery-related tourism, as well as the presence of a casino in the Willamette Valley, has greatly impacted the region's transportation infrastructure. Oregon Route 99W, the highway running through the heart of Willamette Valley wine country (and which is the main street in towns such as Newberg and Dundee), is plagued with frequent traffic jams. Phase I of the Newberg Dundee Bypass (avoiding the prime growing areas in the hills) is under construction and expected to open in 2017.

Wine Industry 

A growing number of organizations have been established to promote Oregon Wine. In February of each year the Oregon Wine Board and Oregon Wine Grower's association team up to hold the Oregon Wine Symposium.

Statewide organizations:  
 Oregon Beer and Wine Distributors Association is a full-service, professional trade association representing beer and wine distribution companies in Oregon since 1975.  
 Oregon Pinot Camp brings together invite-only members of the wine trade to learn about Oregon Pinot Noir so they can better represent Oregon Wines to their customers.  
 Oregon Pinot Gris is a pinot gris centered marketing organization created by nine Oregon wineries in 2011.   
 Oregon Wine Board is a semi-independent Oregon state agency managing marketing, research and education initiatives that support and advance the Oregon wine and wine grape industry.
 Oregon Wine Grower's Association advances and protects the investments of its members.
 Oregon Wine Press is a monthly print and online publication supporting the wine industry.
 Steamboat Pinot Noir Conference is an annual event for winemakers held since 1980 to openly exchange information and share experiences regarding the growing of Pinot noir and the styles and techniques of Pinot noir winemaking.
Regional organizations, largely aligned to AVAs:  
 Applegate Valley Wine Trail supports 17 member wineries.  
 Chehalem Mountain Winegrowers Association supports 67 member vineyards and wineries.  
 Columbia Gorge Winegrowers supports wineries from both Oregon and Washington along the Columbia gorge.  
 Dundee Hills Winegrowers Association supports 41 member wineries within the Dundee Hills AVA.  
 Heart of Willamette Wineries supports 18 member wineries located between Salem and Junction City Oregon.  
 McMinnville Foothills Winegrowers supports 8 member vineyards and wineries within the McMinnville AVA.  
 North Willamette Vintners brings together wineries, vineyards and tourism partners to support and advance the North Willamette wine region.  
 Ribbon Ridge Winegrower's Association supports 20 member vineyards and wineries within the AVA.  
 Rogue Valley Winegrowers Association supports more than 40 wineries within the Rogue Valley.
 South Willamette Wineries Association has 20 member wineries from the region encircling Eugene OR.
 Southern Oregon Winery Association supports more than 150 wineries spanning 4 AVAs: Applegate Valley AVA (a sub-appellation of Rogue Valley AVA), Elkton Oregon AVA, Rogue Valley AVA, and Umpqua Valley AVA.
 Umpqua Valley Wineries has 23 member wineries from the Umpqua Valley AVA.
 Willamette Valley Wineries Association was created in 1986 with 11 members from Yamhill County and has grown to 215 members.
 Willamette Valley Visitors Association promotes the region with their popular Oregon Wine Country website.
 Yamhill-Carlton Winegrowers Association has 64 vineyard members as of August 2016.

Recognition

Recognition for quality
Oregon wines have won several major awards, and/or been praised by notable wine critics.
 In 1904, Forest Grove winemaker Ernest Reuter won a silver medal at the St. Louis World's Fair.
 In 1979, Eyrie Vineyards' 1975 South Block Pinot noir placed in the top 10 of Burgundy-style wines at the Gault-Millau French Wine Olympiades, and was rated the top Pinot noir. In a rematch, however, the Eyrie finished second to a French wine.
 Two gold medals in the International Wine Competition in London in 1982.
 A Yamhill Valley Vineyards 1983 Pinot noir was the first place preference at the 1985 Oregon Pinot noir/French Burgundy Challenge at the International Wine Center in New York City.

Other recognition
 Evening Lands's 98 point 2012 Eola-Amity Hills Seven Springs Vineyard La Source Pinot Noir was #3 of 100 on 2015 Wine Spectator's annual Top 100 Wines. 5 other Oregon wines made the 2015 list: Big Table Farm's 2012 Willamette Valley Pinot Noir at No. 11, Bergström's 2013 Ribbon Ridge Le Pré Du Col Vineyard Pinot Noir at No. 13, Soléna's 2012 Willamette Valley Grande Cuvée Pinot Noir at No. 38 and Colene Clemens' 2012 Chehalem Mountains Margo Pinot Noir at No. 45.
 Beaux Freres The Upper Terrace 2012 received the second higher score in the history of Oregon wine a 97 also from Wine Spectator.
 In 2006, seven Oregon wines made Wine Spectators annual Top 100 Wines list. Producers on the list included: Shea, Argyle, Archery Summit, Lemelson, Ken Wright, Elk Cove, and Benton Lane.

Notable wineries and vineyards

This is a list of notable operating and defunct wineries and vineyards in the state of Oregon''' in the United States, including those in the Southern Oregon AVA and Willamette Valley AVA. Included are wineries and vineyards owned or operated by larger wineries not based in Oregon.

See also
 Alcoholic beverages in Oregon
 Oregon Wine Board

References

Further reading, by publication date
 Spectacular Wineries of Oregon: A Captivating Tour of Established, Estate, and Boutique Wineries, 2015, 
 Wine Map of the Pacific Northwest, 2015, 
 Explorer's Guide to Oregon Wine, 2013, 
 Winemakers of the Willamette Valley: Pioneering Vintners from Oregon's Wine Country, 2013, 
 The Law of Wine A Guide to Business and Legal Issues in Oregon, 2013
 Voodoo Vintners: Oregon's Astonishing Biodynamic Winegrowers, 2011, 
 Essential Wines and Wineries of the Pacific Northwest: A Guide to the Wine Countries of Washington, Oregon, British Columbia, and Idaho, 2010, 
 WineTrails of Oregon, 2009, 
 Oregon Eco-Friendly Wine: Leading the World in "Green" Wine, 2008, 
 Oregon: The Taste of Wine, 2008, 
 Pacific Pinot Noir: A Comprehensive Winery Guide for Consumers and Connoisseurs, 2008, 
 Cooking with the Wines of Oregon, 2007, 
 Grail, The: A year ambling & shambling through an Oregon vineyard in pursuit of the best pinot noir wine in the whole wild world, 2006, 
 At Home in the Vineyard: Cultivating a Winery, an Industry, and a Life, 2006, 
 Wines of the Pacific Northwest, 2006, 
 Oregon Wine Country, 2004, 
 Oregon Viticulture, 2003, 
 A Travel Companion to the Wineries of the Pacific Northwest: Featuring the Pinot Noirs of Oregon's Willamette Valley, 2002, 
 Boys Up North: Dick Erath and the Early Oregon Wine Makers, 1997, 
 Oregon Winegrape Grower's Guide, 1992, 
 The Wines and Wineries of America's Northwest: the Premium Wines of Oregon, Washington, and Idaho, 1986, 

External links
 Oregon Winegrowers Association 
 Oregon Wine Center 
 Discover the Pacific Northwest Wineries, Breweries and Distilleries
 OLCC changes wine label laws, a 2007 article from Portland Business Journal''
 Oregon Wine: Grapes of Place  Documentary produced by Oregon Public Broadcasting
  TTB AVA Map

 
Agriculture in Oregon
Wine regions of the United States by state